Huddersfield Town's 1944–45 campaign saw Town continuing to play in the Wartime League. They finished 1st in the 1st NRL Competition, 34th in the War Cup qualifiers and 13th in the 2nd NRL Competition.

Results

1st NRL Competition

2nd NRL Competition

Notes

Huddersfield Town A.F.C. seasons
Huddersfield Town